33 Giri is a 2012 Italian dramatic short film directed by Riccardo Di Gerlando.

Synopsis 
A man with Down syndrome dreams of reviving his dead mother.

Awards 
33 Giri has been screened in over 30 film festivals worldwide. It won or was selected in the following festivals: 
 Best Short Movie Kalat Nissa International Film Festival – Caltanissetta (Italia) 
 Best Short Movie Festival del Cinema Indipendente SGUARDI – Cles (Trento, Italia) 
 Best Short Movie Sociale Capua Cine Art – Capua (Caserta, Italia)
 Miglior Linguaggio Filmico Gold Elephant World International Film Festival – Catania (Italia)
 Best Short Movie Sociale Palagiano in Corto – (Taranto, Puglia)
 Filmmaker Award No Fear Film Festival – Salt Lake City (Utah, USA)
 Selection David di Donatello 2013
 Official Selection Golden Palmera Film Festival – (Dubai)
 Official Selection 21st International Festival of Local Televisions – Kosice (Slovacchia)
 Official Selection Festival International Entr’2 Marches - Cannes (Francia)
 Official Selection Sprout Film Festival – New York City (New York, USA)

References

External links 
 

2010s Italian-language films
2012 films